

Events

Pre-1600
 489 – The Ostrogoths under Theoderic the Great defeat the forces of Odoacer for the second time. 
737 – The Turgesh drive back an Umayyad invasion of Khuttal, follow them south of the Oxus, and capture their baggage train.
1139 – A magnitude 7.7 earthquake strikes the Caucasus mountains in the Seljuk Empire, causing mass destruction and killing up to 300,000 people.
1399 – Henry IV is proclaimed king of England.
1520 – Suleiman the Magnificent is proclaimed sultan of the Ottoman Empire.
1541 – Spanish conquistador Hernando de Soto and his forces enter Tula territory in present-day western Arkansas, encountering fierce resistance.
1551 – A coup by the military establishment of Japan's Ōuchi clan forces their lord to commit suicide, and their city is burned.

1601–1900
1744 – War of the Austrian Succession: France and Spain defeat Sardinia at the Battle of Madonna dell'Olmo, but soon have to withdraw from Sardinia anyway.
1791 – The first performance of Mozart's opera The Magic Flute takes place two months before his death.
  1791   – France's National Constituent Assembly is dissolved, to be replaced the next day by the National Legislative Assembly.
1863 – Georges Bizet's opera Les pêcheurs de perles, premiered in Paris.
1882 – Thomas Edison's first commercial hydroelectric power plant (later known as Appleton Edison Light Company) begins operation.
1888 – Jack the Ripper kills his third and fourth victims, Elizabeth Stride and Catherine Eddowes.

1901–present
1906 – The Royal Galician Academy, the Galician language's biggest linguistic authority, starts working in La Coruña, Spain.
1907 – The McKinley National Memorial, the final resting place of assassinated U.S. President William McKinley and his family, is dedicated in Canton, Ohio.
1909 – The Cunard Line's RMS Mauretania makes a record-breaking westbound crossing of the Atlantic, that will not be bettered for 20 years.
1915 – World War I: Radoje Ljutovac becomes the first soldier in history to shoot down an enemy aircraft with ground-to-air fire.
1918 – Ukrainian War of Independence: Insurgent forces led by Nestor Makhno defeat the Central Powers at the battle of Dibrivka.
1935 – The Hoover Dam, astride the border between the U.S. states of Arizona and Nevada, is dedicated.
1938 – Britain, France, Germany and Italy sign the Munich Agreement, whereby Germany annexes the Sudetenland region of Czechoslovakia.
  1938   – The League of Nations unanimously outlaws "intentional bombings of civilian populations".
1939 – World War II: General Władysław Sikorski becomes prime minister of the Polish government-in-exile.
  1939   – NBC broadcasts the first televised American football game.
1941 – World War II: The Babi Yar massacre comes to an end.
1943 – The United States Merchant Marine Academy is dedicated by President Roosevelt.
1944 – The Germans commence a counter offensive to retake the Nijmegen salient, this having been captured by the allies during Operation Market Garden.  
1945 – The Bourne End rail crash, in Hertfordshire, England, kills 43.
1947 – The 1947 World Series begins. It is the first to be televised, to include an African-American player, to exceed $2 million in receipts, to see a pinch-hit home run, and to have six umpires on the field.
  1947   – Pakistan joins the United Nations.
1949 – The Berlin Airlift ends.
1954 – The U.S. Navy submarine  is commissioned as the world's first nuclear-powered vessel.
1965 – Six Indonesian Army generals were assassinated by the September 30 Movement. The PKI was blamed for the latter, resulting in mass killings of suspected leftists.
1966 – Bechuanaland declares its independence, and becomes the Republic of Botswana.
1968 – The Boeing 747 is rolled out and shown to the public for the first time.
1970 – Jordan makes a deal with the PFLP for the release of the remaining hostages from the Dawson's Field hijackings.
1975 – Malév Flight 240 crashes into the Mediterranean Sea while on approach to Beirut International Airport in Beirut, Lebanon, killing 60.
1978 – Finnair Flight 405 is hijacked by Aarno Lamminparras in Oulu, Finland.
1980 – Ethernet specifications are published by Xerox working with Intel and Digital Equipment Corporation.
1993 – The 6.2  Latur earthquake shakes Maharashtra, India with a maximum Mercalli intensity of VIII (Severe) killing 9,748 and injuring 30,000.
1999 – The Tokaimura nuclear accident causes the deaths of two technicians in Japan's second-worst nuclear accident.
2000 – Israeli-Palestinian conflict: Twelve-year-old Muhammad al-Durrah is shot and killed on the second day of the Second Intifada.
2005 – Controversial drawings of Muhammad are printed in a Danish newspaper.
2009 – The 7.6  Sumatra earthquake leaves 1,115 people dead.
2016 – Hurricane Matthew becomes a Category 5 hurricane, making it the strongest hurricane to form in the Caribbean Sea since 2007.
  2016   – Two paintings with a combined value of $100 million are recovered after having been stolen from the Van Gogh Museum in 2002.

Births

Pre-1600
1207 – Rumi, Persian mystic and poet (d. 1273)
1227 – Pope Nicholas IV (d. 1292)
1530 – Girolamo Mercuriale, Italian philologist and physician (d. 1606)
1550 – Michael Maestlin, German astronomer and mathematician (d. 1631)

1601–1900
1622 – Johann Sebastiani, German composer (d. 1683)
1689 – Jacques Aubert, French violinist and composer (d. 1753)
1700 – Stanisław Konarski, Polish monk, poet, and playwright (d. 1773)
1710 – John Russell, 4th Duke of Bedford, English politician, Lord President of the Council (d. 1771)
1714 – Étienne Bonnot de Condillac, French epistemologist and philosopher (d. 1780)
1732 – Jacques Necker, Swiss-French politician, Prime Minister of France (d. 1804)
1743 – Christian Ehregott Weinlig, German cantor and composer (d. 1813)
1765 – José María Morelos, Mexican priest and general (d. 1815)
1800 – Decimus Burton, English architect, designed the Pharos Lighthouse (d. 1881)
1813 – John Rae, Scottish physician and explorer (d. 1893)
1814 – Lucinda Hinsdale Stone, American feminist, educator, and philanthropist (d. 1900)
1827 – Ellis H. Roberts, American journalist and politician, 20th Treasurer of the United States (d. 1918)
1832 – Ann Jarvis, American activist, co-founded Mother's Day (d. 1905)
1836 – Remigio Morales Bermúdez, Peruvian politician, 56th President of Peru (d. 1894)
1852 – Charles Villiers Stanford, Irish composer, conductor, and educator (d. 1924)
1861 – William Wrigley, Jr., American businessman, founded Wrigley Company (d. 1932)
1863 – Reinhard Scheer, German admiral (d. 1928)
1870 – Thomas W. Lamont, American banker and philanthropist (d. 1948)
  1870   – Jean Baptiste Perrin, French-American physicist and chemist, Nobel Prize laureate (d. 1942)
1882 – Hans Geiger, German physicist and academic (d. 1945)
1883 – Bernhard Rust, German educator and politician (d. 1945)
  1883   – Nora Stanton Blatch Barney, American civil engineer, architect, and suffragist (d. 1971)
1887 – Lil Dagover, Indonesian-German actress (d. 1980)
1893 – Lansdale Ghiselin Sasscer, American lieutenant, lawyer, and politician (d. 1964)
1895 – Lewis Milestone, Moldovan-American director, producer, and screenwriter (d. 1980)
1897 – Alfred Wintle, Russian-English soldier and politician (d. 1966)
  1897   – Charlotte Wolff, German-English physician and psychotherapist (d. 1986)
1898 – Renée Adorée, French-American actress (d. 1933)
  1898   – Princess Charlotte, Duchess of Valentinois (d. 1977)
  1898   – Edgar Parin d'Aulaire, German-American author and illustrator (d. 1986)

1901–present
1901 – Thelma Terry, American bassist and bandleader (d. 1966)
1904 – Waldo Williams, Welsh poet and academic (d. 1971)
1905 – Nevill Francis Mott, English physicist and academic, Nobel Prize laureate (d. 1996)
  1905   – Michael Powell, English director, producer, and screenwriter (d. 1990)
1906 – Mireille Hartuch, French singer-songwriter and actress (d. 1996)
1908 – David Oistrakh, Ukrainian-Russian violinist and educator (d. 1974)
1910 – Jussi Kekkonen, Finnish captain (d. 1962)
1911 – Gustave Gilbert, American psychologist (d. 1977)
1912 – Kenny Baker, American singer and actor (d. 1985)
1913 – Bill Walsh, American screenwriter and producer (d. 1975)
1915 – Lester Maddox, American businessman and politician, 75th Governor of Georgia (d. 2003)
1917 – Yuri Lyubimov, Russian actor and director (d. 2014)
  1917   – Buddy Rich, American drummer, bandleader, and actor (d. 1987)
1918 – Lewis Nixon, U.S. Army captain (d. 1995)
  1918   – René Rémond, French historian and economist (d. 2007)
1919 – Roberto Bonomi, Argentinian race car driver (d. 1992)
  1919   – Elizabeth Gilels, Ukrainian-Russian violinist and educator (d. 2008)
  1919   – William L. Guy, American lieutenant and politician, 26th Governor of North Dakota (d. 2013)
  1919   – Patricia Neway, American soprano and actress (d. 2012)
1921 – Deborah Kerr, Scottish-English actress (d. 2007)
  1921   – Aldo Parisot, Brazilian-American cellist and educator (d. 2018)
1922 – Lamont Johnson, American actor, director, and producer (d. 2010)
  1922   – Hrishikesh Mukherjee, Indian director, producer, and screenwriter (d. 2006)
1923 – Donald Swann, Welsh-English pianist and composer  (d. 1994)
1924 – Truman Capote, American novelist, playwright, and screenwriter (d. 1984)
1925 – Arkady Ostashev, Russian engineer and educator (d. 1998)
1926 – Heino Kruus, Estonian basketball player and coach (d. 2012)
  1926   – Robin Roberts, American baseball player, coach, and sportscaster (d. 2010)
1927 – W. S. Merwin, American poet and translator (d. 2019)
1928 – Elie Wiesel, Romanian-American author, academic, and activist, Nobel Prize laureate (d. 2016)
  1928   – Ray Willsey, Canadian-American football player and coach (d. 2013)
1929 – Carol Fenner, American author and illustrator (d. 2002)
  1929   – Vassilis Papazachos, Greek seismologist and academic
  1929   – Leticia Ramos-Shahani, Filipino politician, diplomat and writer (d. 2017)
  1929   – Dorothee Sölle, German theologian and author (d. 2003)
1931 – Angie Dickinson, American actress
  1931   – Teresa Gorman, English educator and politician (d. 2015)
1932 – Shintaro Ishihara, Japanese author, playwright, and politician, Governor of Tokyo (d. 2022)
  1932   – Johnny Podres, American baseball player and coach (d. 2008)
1933 – Cissy Houston, American singer
1934 – Alan A'Court, English footballer and manager (d. 2009)
  1934   – Udo Jürgens, Austrian-Swiss singer-songwriter and pianist (d. 2014)
  1934   – Anna Kashfi, Indian-American actress (d. 2015)
1935 – Johnny Mathis, American singer and actor
1936 – Jim Sasser, American lawyer and politician, 6th United States Ambassador to China
  1936   – Sevgi Soysal, Turkish author (d. 1976)
1937 – Jurek Becker, Polish-German author (d. 1997)
  1937   – Valentyn Sylvestrov, Ukrainian pianist and composer
  1937   – Gary Hocking, Rhodesian motorcycle racer (d. 1962)
1938 – Alan Hacker, English clarinet player and educator (d. 2012)
1939 – Len Cariou, Canadian actor 
  1939   – Anthony Green, English painter and academic
  1939   – Jean-Marie Lehn, French chemist and academic, Nobel Prize laureate
1940 – Claudia Card, American philosopher and academic (d. 2015)
  1940   – Harry Jerome, Canadian sprinter (d. 1982)
  1940   – Dewey Martin, Canadian-American drummer (d. 2009)
1941 – Samuel F. Pickering, Jr., American author and educator
  1941   – Kamalesh Sharma, Indian academic and diplomat, 5th Commonwealth Secretary General
  1941   – Reine Wisell, Swedish race car driver (d. 2022)
1942 – Gus Dudgeon, English record producer (d. 2002)
  1942   – Frankie Lymon, American singer-songwriter (d. 1968)
1943 – Johann Deisenhofer, German-American biochemist and biophysicist, Nobel Prize laureate
  1943   – Marilyn McCoo, American singer 
  1943   – Philip Moore, English organist and composer
  1943   – Ian Ogilvy, English-American actor, playwright, and author
1944 – Diane Dufresne, Canadian singer and painter
  1944   – Jimmy Johnstone, Scottish footballer (d. 2006)
  1944   – Red Robbins, American basketball player (d. 2009)
1945 – Richard Edwin Hills, English astronomer and academic
  1945   – Ehud Olmert, Israeli lawyer and politician, 12th Prime Minister of Israel
1946 – Fran Brill, American actress, singer, and puppeteer
  1946   – Robert Gascoyne-Cecil, 7th Marquess of Salisbury, English academic and politician, Leader of the House of Lords
  1946   – Héctor Lavoe, Puerto Rican-American singer-songwriter (d. 1993)
  1946   – Jochen Mass, German race car driver
  1946   – Paul Sheahan, Australian cricketer and educator
  1946   – Claude Vorilhon, French journalist, founded Raëlism
1947 – Marc Bolan, English singer-songwriter and guitarist (d. 1977)
  1947   – Rula Lenska, English actress 
1948 – Craig Kusick, American baseball player and coach (d. 2006)
1949 – Michel Tognini, French pilot, engineer, military officer and astronaut
1950 – Laura Esquivel, Mexican author and screenwriter
  1950   – Victoria Tennant, English actress and dancer
1951 – John Lloyd, English screenwriter and producer
  1951   – Barry Marshall, Australian physician and academic, Nobel Prize laureate
  1951   – Simon White, English astrophysicist and academic
1952 – John Lombardo, American singer-songwriter and guitarist
1953 – Matt Abts, American drummer
  1953   – Deborah Allen, American country music singer-songwriter, author, and actress 
1954 – Basia, Polish singer-songwriter and record producer
  1954   – Scott Fields, American guitarist and composer
  1954   – Patrice Rushen, American singer-songwriter and producer 
1955 – Andy Bechtolsheim, German engineer, co-founded Sun Microsystems
  1955   – Frankie Kennedy, Northern Irish flute player  (d. 1994)
1956 – Trevor Morgan, English footballer and manager
1957 – Fran Drescher, American actress, producer, and screenwriter
1958 – Marty Stuart, American singer-songwriter and guitarist
1959 – Ettore Messina, Italian basketball player and coach
1960 – Julia Adamson, Canadian-English keyboard player, composer, and producer 
  1960   – Nicola Griffith, English-American author
  1960   – Miki Howard, American singer-songwriter, producer, and actress 
  1960   – Blanche Lincoln, American politician
1961 – Gary Coyne, Australian rugby league player
  1961   – Eric Stoltz, American actor, director, and producer
  1961   – Mel Stride, English politician
  1961   – Eric van de Poele, Belgian race car driver
1963 – David Barbe, American bass player and producer 
1964 – Trey Anastasio, American singer-songwriter, guitarist, and composer
  1964   – Monica Bellucci, Italian actress and fashion model
1965 – Omid Djalili, English comedian, actor, and producer
1966 – Gary Armstrong, Scottish rugby player
  1966   – Markus Burger, German pianist, composer, and educator
1967 – Emmanuelle Houdart, Swiss-French author and illustrator
1969 – Gintaras Einikis, Lithuanian basketball player
  1969   – Chris von Erich, American wrestler (d. 1991)
1970 – Tony Hale, American actor and producer
  1970   – Damian Mori, Australian footballer and manager
1971 – Jenna Elfman, American actress and producer
1972 – Jamal Anderson, American football player and sportscaster
  1972   – Ari Behn, Danish-Norwegian author and playwright (d. 2019)
  1972   – John Campbell, American bass player and songwriter 
  1972   – Mayumi Kojima, Japanese singer-songwriter
  1972   – José Lima, Dominican-American baseball player (d. 2010)
1974 – Jeremy Giambi, American baseball player (d. 2022)
  1974   – Tom Greatrex, English politician
  1974   – Ben Phillips, English cricketer
  1974   – Daniel Wu, American–born Hong Kong actor, director, and producer
1975 – Jay Asher, American author
  1975   – Marion Cotillard, French-American actress and singer
  1975   – Carlos Guillén, Venezuelan baseball player
  1975   – Laure Pequegnot, French skier
  1975   – Christopher Jackson, American actor, singer, musician, and composer
  1976   – Georgie Bingham, British radio and television presenter  
1977 – Roy Carroll, Northern Irish goalkeeper and manager
  1977   – Nick Curran, American singer-songwriter, guitarist, and producer (d. 2012) 
1978 – Małgorzata Glinka-Mogentale, Polish female volleyball player
1979 – Cameron Bruce, Australian footballer and coach
  1979   – Andy van der Meyde, Dutch footballer
1980 – Martina Hingis, Czechoslovakia-born Swiss tennis player 
  1980   – Milagros Sequera, Venezuelan tennis player
1981 – Cecelia Ahern, Irish author
  1981   – Dominique Moceanu, American gymnast
1982 – Lacey Chabert, American actress 
  1982   – Ryane Clowe, Canadian ice hockey player.
  1982   – Yan Stastny, Canadian ice hockey player
  1982   – Dmytro Boyko, Ukrainian footballer
1983 – Boniek Forbes, Guinea-Bissau footballer
  1983   – Andreea Răducan, Romanian gymnast
1984 – Georgios Eleftheriou, Greek footballer
  1984   – T-Pain, American rapper, producer, and actor
1985 – Adam Cooney, Australian footballer
  1985   – David Gower, Australian rugby league player
  1985   – Téa Obreht, Serbian-American author
  1985   – Cristian Rodríguez, Uruguayan footballer
1986 – Olivier Giroud, French footballer
  1986   – Martin Guptill, New Zealand cricketer
  1986   – Ben Lovett, Welsh musician and songwriter
  1986   – Cristián Zapata, Colombian footballer
1987 – Aida Garifullina, Russian operatic soprano
1988 – Eglė Staišiūnaitė, Lithuanian hurdler
1989 – André Weis, German footballer
1991 – Thomas Röhler, German javelin thrower
1992 – Ezra Miller, American actor and singer
1994 – Aliya Mustafina, Russian gymnast
1996 – Jacob Host, Australian rugby league player
1997 – Yana Kudryavtseva, Russian gymnast
  1997   – Max Verstappen, Dutch Formula One driver
1998 – Yui Imaizumi, Japanese tarento
  1998   – Trevi Moran, American youtuber and singer
  2002   – Levi Miller, Australian actor and model
  2002 – Tara Würth, Crotian tennis player
2002 – Maddie Ziegler, American dancer and actress

Deaths

Pre-1600
420 – Jerome, Roman priest, theologian, and saint
 653 – Honorius of Canterbury, Italian archbishop and saint
 940 – Fan Yanguang, Chinese general
 954 – Louis IV of France (b. 920)
1101 – Anselm IV, Italian archbishop
1246 – Yaroslav II of Vladimir (b. 1191)
1288 – Leszek II the Black, Polish prince, Duke of Łęczyca, Sieradz, Kraków, Sandomierz (b. 1241)
1376 – Adelaide of Vianden, German countess
1440 – Reginald Grey, 3rd Baron Grey de Ruthyn, Welsh soldier and politician (b. 1362)
1487 – John Sutton, 1st Baron Dudley, English politician, Lord Lieutenant of Ireland (b. 1400)
1551 – Ōuchi Yoshitaka, Japanese daimyō (b. 1507)
1560 – Melchior Cano, Spanish theologian (b. 1525)
1572 – Francis Borgia, 4th Duke of Gandía, Spanish priest and saint, 3rd Superior General of the Society of Jesus (b. 1510)
1581 – Hubert Languet, French diplomat and reformer (b. 1518)

1601–1900
1626 – Nurhaci, Chinese emperor (b. 1559)
1628 – Fulke Greville, 1st Baron Brooke, English poet and politician, Chancellor of the Exchequer (b. 1554)
1770 – Thomas Robinson, 1st Baron Grantham, English politician and diplomat, Secretary of State for the Southern Department (b. 1695)
  1770   – George Whitefield, English-American priest and theologian (b. 1714)
1865 – Samuel David Luzzatto, Italian poet and scholar (b. 1800)
1866 – Per Gustaf Svinhufvud af Qvalstad, Swedo-Finnish treasurer of Tavastia province, manor host, and paternal grandfather of President P. E. Svinhufvud (b. 1804)
1891 – Georges Ernest Boulanger, French general and politician, French Minister of War (b. 1837)
1897 – Thérèse of Lisieux, French nun and saint (b. 1873)

1901–present
1910 – Maurice Lévy, French mathematician and engineer (b. 1838)
1921 – Fanya Baron, Lithuanian Jewish anarchist (b. 1887)
1942 – Hans-Joachim Marseille, German captain and pilot (b. 1919)
1943 – Franz Oppenheimer, German-American sociologist and economist (b. 1864)
1946 – Takashi Sakai, Japanese general and politician, Governor of Hong Kong (b. 1887)
1955 – James Dean, American actor (b. 1931)
1959 – Henry Barwell, Australian politician, 28th Premier of South Australia (b. 1877)
1961 – Onésime Gagnon, Canadian scholar and politician, 20th Lieutenant Governor of Quebec (b. 1888)
1973 – Peter Pitseolak, Canadian photographer and author (b. 1902)
1974 – Carlos Prats, Chilean general and politician, Chilean Minister of Defense (b. 1915)
1977 – Mary Ford, American singer and guitarist (b. 1924)
1978 – Edgar Bergen, American actor and ventriloquist (b. 1903)
1985 – Charles Francis Richter, American seismologist and physicist (b. 1900)
  1985   – Simone Signoret, French actress (b. 1921)
1986 – Nicholas Kaldor, Hungarian-British economist (b. 1908)
1987 – Alfred Bester, American author and screenwriter (b. 1913)
1988 – Al Holbert, American race car driver (b. 1946)
1989 – Virgil Thomson, American composer and critic (b. 1896)
1990 – Rob Moroso, American race car driver (b. 1968)
  1990   – Alice Parizeau, Polish-Canadian journalist and author (b. 1930)
  1990   – Patrick White, Australian novelist, poet, and playwright, Nobel Prize laureate (b. 1912)
1991 – Toma Zdravković, Serbian singer-songwriter (b. 1938)
1994 – André Michel Lwoff, French microbiologist and virologist, Nobel Prize laureate (b. 1902)
1998 – Marius Goring, English actor (b. 1912)
  1998   – Dan Quisenberry, American baseball player and poet (b. 1953)
  1998   – Robert Lewis Taylor, American soldier and author (b. 1912)
2002 – Göran Kropp, Swedish race car driver and mountaineer (b. 1966)
  2002   – Hans-Peter Tschudi, Swiss lawyer and politician, 63rd President of the Swiss Confederation (b. 1913)
2003 – Yusuf Bey, American activist, founded Your Black Muslim Bakery (b. 1935)
  2003   – Ronnie Dawson, American singer-songwriter and guitarist (b. 1939)
  2003   – Robert Kardashian, American lawyer and businessman (b. 1944)
2004 – Gamini Fonseka, Sri Lankan actor, director, and politician (b. 1936)
  2004   – Jacques Levy, American director and songwriter (b. 1935)
  2004   – Michael Relph, English director, producer, and screenwriter (b. 1915)
2008 – J. B. Jeyaretnam, Singaporean lawyer and politician (b. 1926)
2010 – Stephen J. Cannell, American screenwriter and producer (b. 1941)
2011 – Anwar al-Awlaki, American-Yemeni terrorist (b. 1971)
  2011   – Ralph M. Steinman, Canadian-American immunologist and biologist, Nobel Prize laureate (b. 1943)
2012 – Turhan Bey, Austrian actor and producer (b. 1922)
  2012   – Barry Commoner, American biologist, academic, and politician (b. 1917)
  2012   – Bobby Jaggers, American wrestler and engineer (b. 1948)
  2012   – Clara Stanton Jones, American librarian (b. 1913)
  2012   – Barbara Ann Scott, Canadian-American figure skater (b. 1928)
  2012   – Boris Šprem, Croatian lawyer and politician, 8th Speaker of the Croatian Parliament (b. 1956)
2013 – Janet Powell, Australian educator and politician (b. 1942)
2014 – Molvi Iftikhar Hussain Ansari, Indian cleric and politician (b. 1940)
  2014   – Martin Lewis Perl, American physicist and engineer, Nobel Prize laureate (b. 1927)
2015 – Guido Altarelli, Italian-Swiss physicist and academic (b. 1941)
  2015   – Claude Dauphin, French businessman (b. 1951)
  2015   – Göran Hägg, Swedish author and critic (b. 1947)
2017 – Monty Hall, American game show host (b. 1921)
  2017   – Vladimir Voevodsky, Russian-American mathematician (b. 1966)
2018 – Kim Larsen, Danish rock musician (b. 1945)
  2018   – Geoffrey Hayes, British television presenter and actor (b. 1942)
  2018   – Sonia Orbuch, Polish resistance fighter during the Second World War and Holocaust educator. (b. 1925)
2019 – Victoria Braithwaite, British research scientist who proved fish feel pain (b. 1967)
2021 – Koichi Sugiyama, Japanese composer and orchestrator (b. 1931)

Holidays and observances
Agricultural Reform (Nationalization) Day (São Tomé and Príncipe)
Birth of Morelos (Mexico)
Blasphemy Day, educates individuals and groups about blasphemy laws and defends freedom of expression
Boy's Day (Poland)
Christian feast day:
Gregory the Illuminator
Honorius of Canterbury
Jerome
September 30 (Eastern Orthodox liturgics)
Independence Day (Botswana) or Botswana Day, celebrates the independence of Botswana from United Kingdom in 1966.
International Translation Day (International Federation of Translators)
National Day for Truth and Reconciliation or Orange Shirt Day (Canada)

References

External links

 
 
 

Days of the year
September